Ruslan Vasylovych Zaparanyuk (born in 1974), is a Ukrainian politician who is currently the governor of Chernivtsi Oblast since 11 July 2022.

Biography
Ruslan Zaparanyuk was born in 1974. In 1997, he graduated from Chernivtsi University with a specialty of "physicist, teacher". In 2003, he studied at the Chernivtsi Institute of Trade and Economics of the Kyiv National University of Trade and Economics with a specialty of "accounting and auditing economist".

He worked in various positions in the financial sector of the Chernivtsi Oblast. From July 2014 to July 2022, he was the head of the branch of the Chernivtsi regional administration of State Savings Bank of Ukraine JSC.

He is the founder of the public organization "Bukovynsky oberig", which worked in the field of law. In 2020, he ran for the Chernivtsi Oblast Council from the United Alternative party.

On 11 July 2022, Zaparanyuk became the Governor of Chernivtsi Oblast.

References

1974 births
Living people
21st-century Ukrainian politicians
Governors of Chernivtsi Oblast
Chernivtsi University alumni